Masstown (2021 population: 156), formerly Cobequid, is a farming community located approximately  from Truro, Nova Scotia.

Historic background 
Masstown has its beginnings with French settlers, known as Acadians. The Acadian culture consisted primarily of farming; remains of marshland dykes, that cover the entire coast of the community, indicate their advanced farming systems. Once an old Acadian settlement, Masstown was the site of the first Acadian church in Nova Scotia, and a cairn is erected at the nearby United Church to commemorate this former landmark. The subsequent Catholic Church inspired the community's name: "Mass" town.

Present-day community 
Masstown is located 15 minutes west of Truro on Nova Scotia Trunk 2 or Exit 12 off Nova Scotia Highway 104. The small farming community has a local market and now a Tim Hortons and Greco. The local market, the Masstown Market is a tourist attraction for the community as well as the fish market and restaurants and diners nearby. Masstown Market is a popular halfway stop for people travelling between Moncton and Halifax.

Demographics 

References 

 Masstown on Destination Nova Scotia
2016 Census Profile

General Service Areas in Nova Scotia
Communities in Colchester County
Designated places in Nova Scotia